The 1964 Wales rugby union tour of Africa was a collection of friendly rugby union games undertaken by the Wales national rugby union team to Africa. The tour took in five matches against African regional and invitational teams with one test against South Africa. This was the first official Wales tour to the southern hemisphere; Wales' first match outside Europe (and thus their first match in the Southern Hemisphere) was played against East Africa on Tuesday May 12, 1964.

The tour was not a success for Wales. Under the leadership of Clive Rowlands, Wales won the opening two games, but were unconvincing in the second match against Boland. The South African test at Durban saw Wales lose by the largest margin in forty years.

Results
Scores and results list Wales' points tally first.

Touring party

Manager: David J. Phillips

Full backs
 Grahame Hodgson (Neath)
 Haydn Davies (London Welsh)

Three-quarters
 Dewi Bebb (Swansea)
 Keith Bradshaw (Bridgend)
 John Dawes (London Welsh)
 Ken Jones (Llanelli)
 Stuart Watkins (Newport)

Half backs
 Clive Rowlands (Pontypool) (captain)
 Allan Lewis (Abertillery)
 David Watkins (Newport)
 M. Young (Bridgend RFC)

Forwards
 Len Cunningham (Aberavon)
 Norman Gale (Llanelli)
 David Hayward (Cardiff)
 J. Isaacs (Swansea)
 John Mantle (Newport)
 Haydn Morgan (Abertillery)
 Alun Pask (Abertillery)
 Brian Price (Newport)
 Gareth Prothero (Bridgend)
 Brian Thomas (Neath)
 Ron Waldron (Neath)
 Denzil Williams (Ebbw Vale)

Matches

East Africa

South Africa

Bibliography
 
 

1964 rugby union tours
1964
1964
1964
Rugby union
1964 in South African rugby union
1963–64 in Welsh rugby union
History of rugby union matches between South Africa and Wales